Sri Ramya is an Indian actress from Telugu and Tamil films. She made her acting debut by the film  1940 Lo Oka Gramam in 2007. She is a Winner of Nandi Special Jury Award at Nandi Awards in 2008.

Career
Sri Ramya  made her acting debut by the Telugu film  1940 Lo Oka Gramam in 2008.
In 2011 she acted as a Naxalite in the film Virodhi. She played the lead role in a solo Tamil film titled Yamuna in 2013.

Personal life

Sri Ramya is the elder sister of film actress Sri Divya.

Filmography

Awards and nominations

References

External links

Living people
Year of birth missing (living people)
21st-century Indian actresses
Indian film actresses
Actresses in Tamil cinema
Actresses in Telugu cinema
Nandi Award winners
Actresses from Hyderabad, India